The tropical big-eared brown bat (Histiotus velatus), is a bat species found in Bolivia, Peru, Argentina, Brazil and Paraguay.

References

Histiotus
Mammals described in 1824
Bats of South America
Taxa named by Isidore Geoffroy Saint-Hilaire